Gorton and Abbey Hey is an electoral ward of Manchester, England created by the Local Government Boundary Commission for England (LGBCE) from the previous electoral wards of Gorton North and Gorton South for the local elections 2018.

It is represented in Westminster by Afzal Khan  MP for Manchester Gorton.

Councillors 
Three councillors serve the ward: , Labour (2019–23), Labour (2018–21), and John Hughes, Labour (2018–22).

Elections in 2020s 
* denotes incumbent councillor seeking re-election.

May 2021

Elections in 2010s

May 2019

May 2018

References



Manchester City Council Wards